Mohagher Iqbal is the nom de guerre of the member of the  Moro Islamic Liberation Front who serves as chair of the group's peace panel.

Education
Iqbal was born in Cotabato City and grew up in Datu Odin Sinsuat, Maguindanao. Iqbal attended the Manuel L. Quezon University where he obtained both his bachelor's and master's degree

Career
Iqbal joined the Moro National Liberation Front (MNLF) in August 1972 after he returned from Manila. Later he joined the Moro Islamic Liberation Front (MILF), then known as the New MNLF
Leadership. He served in various posts in both the MNLF and MILF.

Iqbal is a member of the MILF Central Committee, and chair of MILF committee on information. He is also the peace negotiating panel of the group since July 2003.

When the Bangsamoro Transition Commission was formed he was nominated by his group to serve as chair of the peace commission.

Names
Iqbal said that "Mohagher Iqbal" is just one of his alias which he said is natural of those who are part of revolutionary organizations.

His real name along with Murad Ebrahim's became an issue for former DILG secretary, Rafael Alunan III, who says that they travel using a Malaysian passport when travelling to Malaysia for peace talks, disputing their citizenship. Iqbal said that the government are aware of their true names while Miriam Coronel-Ferrer insists they are Filipino citizens.

His real name claimed to be "Datucan M. Abas" by Senator Alan Peter Cayetano but in April 2015, Iqbal says that he will neither confirm or deny the claim by Cayetano and says he will reveal his real name at the “proper time and proper venue.” and questioned the motives of the senator saying it might be an attempt to derail the peace process.

Iqbal also authored books under the pen name, Salah Jubair. Among his works are the Bangsamoro: A nation under endless tyranny and The Long Road to Peace: Inside the GRP-MILF Peace Process which are about the Moro conflict.

References

Filipino Muslims
People from Cotabato City
21st-century Filipino writers
Manuel L. Quezon University alumni
Living people
Members of the Bangsamoro Transition Authority Parliament
Year of birth missing (living people)
Moro Islamic Liberation Front members